Acompsia caucasella is a moth of the family Gelechiidae which is endemic to Caucasus Mountains.

The forewings are light ochreous brown with some yellow, mottled with medium brown scales at the base and in the centre of the forewing. The hindwings are grey. Adults are on wing in July.

Etymology
The species is named after the type region.

References

Moths described in 2002
Moths of Asia
Acompsia